Hopelchén (Yucatec Maya: "place of five wells") is one of the 11 municipalities in the Mexican state of Campeche. It is situated inland in the north of the state. The municipal seat, and largest settlement, is the city of Hopelchén.

History and geography

The municipality of Hopelchén is bordered to the north and east by the state of Yucatán; to the south by the municipality of Calakmul, and to the west by the municipalities of Champotón, Campeche, Tenabo and Hecelchakán.

It covers 7,460.27 km2, accounting for 13% of the state's total surface area.

Demographics
The 2005 INEGI census reported a population of 34,687, down from 36,271 in 1990. Of the 1990 figure, 17,664 spoke one of several indigenous languages, predominantly Yucatec Maya with 14,983 and Ch'ol with  2,039; the total number of indigenous language speakers had fallen to 15,416 by 2005. As of 2010, the municipality had a total population of 37,777.

As of 2010, the city of Hopelchén had a population of 7,295. Other than the city of Hopelchén, the municipality had 269 localities, the largest of which (with 2010 populations in parentheses) were: Bolonchén de Rejón (3,975), Vicente Guerrero (3,198), classified as urban, and Dzibalchén (2,340), Ukum (2,019), Xmabén (1,228), Suc-Tuc (1,179), and Chunchintok (1,086), classified as rural.

Climate

Heritage
The Maya archaeological sites of Chunan-Tunich, Dzibilnocac, Santa Rosa Xtampak, Hochob  and Pak-Chén are located in the municipality. It is also home to two cave complexes: Chuncedro and Xtacumbilxuna’an

References

Link to tables of population data from Census of 2005 INEGI: Instituto Nacional de Estadística, Geografía e Informática
Hopelchén Enciclopedia de los Municipios de México

External links
Ayuntamiento de Hopelchén Official website 
Municipio de Hopelchén from official Campeche state government website 

Municipalities of Campeche